The following is a list of people who were born in or lived in the city of Whittier, California

Entertainment
 Gary Allan (born Gary Allan Herzberg), country music artist, graduated La Serna High School
 Antagonist, metal band signed to Prosthetic Records
 Andrea Barber, actress (Full House)
 Caprice Bourret, supermodel
 Cold War Kids, indie rock band
 Pete Dee Davison, musician (The Adicts)
 Joy Enriquez, singer, actress (7th Heaven)
 Funeral Party, punk/rock band
 William Garwood, actor and director of early silent films in the 1910s
 David Hidalgo, musician (Los Lobos)
 Kathy Hilton, actress, socialite, mother of Paris and Nicky Hilton
 Gabriel Iglesias, comedian and actor
 Vic "the Brick" Jacobs, radio personality
 Adrienne Janic, co-host of Overhaulin', model, and Fanta Girl
 Mark Kostabi, composer and artist
 Paul Kostabi, artist, musician, and producer
 John Alan Lasseter, Academy Award–winning animator and Chief Creative Officer at Pixar and Walt Disney Animation Studios
 Roger Lodge, actor (host of Blind Date)
 Long Gone John, founder of Sympathy for the Record Industry
 Martika, singer
 Tim Minear, screenwriter, director
 Roger Mobley, child actor, moved to Whittier in 1957
 Lorna Patterson, actress
 Merle Pertile, Playboy Playmate, January 1962
 Vaneza Leza Pitynski, actress (The Brothers Garcia)
 Chuck Prophet, musician (solo artist and founder of the band Green On Red)
Dax Reynosa, hip hop and smooth jazz artist and producer, music manager, and film producer
Zane Reynosa, hip hop artist and fashion accessory designer
 Ron Shelton, director, screenwriter (Bull Durham, White Men Can't Jump, Tin Cup)
 Eric Stoltz, actor (Memphis Belle, Jerry Maguire, Pulp Fiction)
 Geoff Stults, actor (7th Heaven)
 Lauren Tewes, actress (The Love Boat)
 Tom Waits, actor, singer-songwriter
 Tina Yothers, actress (Family Ties)
 Michael Sweet musician, Christian rock band (Stryper)
 Robert Sweet musician, Christian rock band (Stryper)
 Oz Fox musician, Christian rock band (Stryper)

Arts and literature
 Horace Bristol, photographer, Life Magazine
 Firoozeh Dumas, author
 Christine Dzidrums, author
 M.F.K. Fisher, author
 Dave Freeman, author
 Mark Kostabi, painter, left Whittier to be discovered in New York
 Paul Kostabi, artist, musician, and producer
 Carol Lay, artist
 Thom Mayne, Pritzker Prize-winning architect
 Craig McCracken, animator
 Tim Miller, performance artist (member of the NEA Four)
 Cherríe Moraga, poet, essayist, playwright
 Joe Ranft - animator, storyboard artist
 Nicole Stansbury, author
 Diane Wakoski, poet
 X-8, artist, publisher

Government
 George Allen, United States Senator (Virginia)
 Louis Caldera, United States Secretary of the Army
 Ronald B. Cameron, Congressman
 Raymond F. Chandler, Sergeant Major of the Army, first enlisted commandant of United States Army Sergeants Major Academy
 James Ferguson, Air Force General
 Jacob F. Gerkens - first chief of the LAPD
 Gabriel Green, write-in presidential candidate
 Lou Henry Hoover, wife of Herbert Hoover and First Lady of the United States
Miller grew up in Whittier.
 Pat Nixon, First Lady, wife of President Richard Nixon
 Richard Nixon, 37th President of the United States, played football at Whittier High School and Whittier College
 Pío Pico, last Mexican governor of Alta California
 Anthony Rendon, assemblyman representing California's 63rd State Assembly district

Sports
 Deborah Babashoff, Swimmer
 Shirley Babashoff, Olympic gold medalist swimmer
Chet Brewer, Negro league baseball player
 George Buehler, football player
 Mitchell Callahan, hockey player
 Chuck Cary, baseball player
 Bob Chandler, football player
 Dave Dalby, football player, center, Oakland Raiders
 Oscar De La Hoya, Olympic and professional boxing champion
 Andy Etchebarren, baseball player (last man to bat against Sandy Koufax)
 Vince Evans, football quarterback
 Arturo Frias, boxing champion
 Michael Garciaparra, baseball player
 Nomar Garciaparra, baseball player
 Greg Hancock, speedway champion
 Payton Jordan, coach of 1968 U.S. Olympic track and field
 Mark Kotsay, baseball player
 Dan Owens, football player
 Jamie Quirk, baseball player
 Ante Razov, soccer player
 Anthony Reyes, baseball player
 Kim Rhode, Olympic gold medalist, (double trap and skeet shooter)
 Mark Sanchez, football quarterback, Philadelphia Eagles
 Art Sherman (born 1937), horse trainer and jockey
 Adam Snyder, football player, San Francisco 49ers
 Jenny Topping, Olympic gold medalist, softball
Aaron Valdes (born 1993), basketball player in the Israeli Basketball Premier League
Al Young, drag racing World Champion & award winning high school teacher
 Jim Zorn, football quarterback, former coach Washington Redskins
 Eddie Zosky, baseball player

Miscellaneous
 Milo Burcham, aviator, test pilot
 Tricia Nixon Cox - daughter of President Nixon
 Francis A. and Hannah Nixon, parents of President Nixon
John Quijada, linguist, constructed language expert
 Nadya Suleman, mother of the Suleman octuplets (born January 26, 2009)
 Kerry Thornley, founder of Discordianism

References

 List
Whittier
Whittier, California